The Liverpool Cruise Terminal is a 350-metre-long (1,150 ft) floating structure situated on the River Mersey enabling large cruise ships to visit without entering the enclosed dock system or berthing mid-river and tendering passengers ashore.  The terminal was officially opened on 21 September 2007 by the Duke of Kent when the Queen Elizabeth 2 berthed at the terminal. The current terminal is composed mainly of a floating landing stage, with a small passenger terminal building, but a larger terminal is under construction. The Terminal is run and operated by Cruise Liverpool, the department within Culture Liverpool at Liverpool City Council.

History

Long distance scheduled commercial passenger travel by ship began in Liverpool in 1819, regular transatlantic crossing service began in 1840 with the Britannia-class steamship. Princes' Landing Stage at Prince's Dock, Liverpool, next to Pier Head opened in 1875, was demolished in 1973 (a year after transatlantic service ceased), leaving Huskisson Dock for passenger ships to berth.

Facilities
The terminal was mostly funded by grants of £9 million from the UK government and £8.6 million from the European Regional Development Fund.

The cruise terminal was developed in conjunction with improvements to the Isle of Man ferry terminal, operated by the Isle of Man Steam Packet Company.  The Royal Navy also berths ships at the terminal several times a year, often allowing the public to visit the ships.

The terminal has seen strong growth and in 2017 welcomed a record 63 cruise ships bringing over 111,000 visitors to the city. The facility is expected to be used by 57 ships and 100,000 passengers and crew in 2018, bringing in an estimated £7 million to the local economy.

Opening

The £9.2 million grant  from the UK government came with the strange condition that the terminal could only be used for cruise port-of-calls, which meant cruises would not be allowed to begin or end at the terminal.  "Turnaround" visits generate more revenue for the port and city than port-of-calls. The reason for the strange restriction was that it was to minimize unfair competition with other ports that had been built with private funding, particularly Southampton.  Liverpool City Council tried unsuccessfully to have this restriction removed in 2009. In July 2011, the council offered to pay back part of the UK government funding in exchange for being allowed turnaround visits, which led Associated British Ports, the owner of Southampton Docks, to take legal advice.  The Southampton Chamber of Commerce collected 12,000 signatures on a petition against the change.  Liverpool city council did cite that £70 million of public money was spent in upgrading the rail link from Southampton Docks to the Midlands container terminals competing directly with the Port of Liverpool. This fell on deaf ears. However, in March 2012, the government agreed a repayment offer from Liverpool Council and construction of a temporary terminal buildings began on the shore and floating terminal landing stage.

Embarkation point
On Tuesday, 29 May 2012 a cruise began from the Pier Head for the first time in 40 years, when Ocean Countess departed on a cruise to the Norwegian fjords.

Current services

Fred. Olsen Cruise Lines, MS Borealis to Iceland, France, Spain and Norway.
The current cruise schedule for operations into and out of the Cruise Terminal can be found on the Cruise Liverpool website and is updated regularly,

Second terminal
The cruise terminal is part of the £5.5 billion Liverpool Waters scheme to regenerate 60 hectares of dockland in Liverpool. The terminal received UK Government approval in March 2013, after Liverpool City Council approved the scheme in March 2012.

A second cruise terminal is under construction as a part of the Liverpool Waters scheme. Liverpool City Council unveiled preliminary plans for a £50 million development for the proposed new cruise stage in September 2017. The new facility is being built slightly further down the Mersey at Princes Dock where the old wooden landing stage currently lies. The new terminal will be able to handle ships with up to 3,600 passengers and would include dedicated passport control as well as a cafe. Plans were submitted for planning permission by the council in November 2017 and work on the new facility began in 2018.

Belfast building and civil engineering firm McLaughlin & Harvey were awarded a contract in March 2018 to support the council during the first of the two phases of development. The first phase of the project involves finalising the design and construction of the new facility and the removal of the existing derelict Princess Jetty. Planning permission for the new facility and the removal of the old jetty was granted in April 2018. £20 million of funding was granted from Liverpool City Region Combined Authority in August 2018 towards financing the next phase of the project, which is due to start in October of that year.
The new passenger terminal will be split across two floors and will be capable of handling vessels carrying up to 3,700 passengers.

Gallery

References

External links
 

Buildings and structures in Liverpool
Water transport in the United Kingdom
Transport in Liverpool
River Mersey
Passenger ship terminals
Maritime Transport in Merseyside